Red Hill is a census-designated place (CDP) in Horry County, South Carolina, United States. The population was 13,223 at the 2010 census, up from 10,509 at the 2000 census.

Geography
Red Hill is in south-central Horry County at  (33.788368, -79.013715). It is bordered to the north by the city of Conway, the county seat, and to the south by Socastee. U.S. Route 501 passes through the northern part of Red Hill, connecting Conway to the north with Myrtle Beach,  to the southeast. South Carolina Highway 544 runs north–south the length of Red Hill, connecting Conway with Socastee. The west side of Red Hill is bordered by the Waccamaw National Wildlife Refuge.

Demographics

2020 census

As of the 2020 United States census, there were 15,906 people, 5,935 households, and 3,980 families residing in the CDP.

2000 census
At the 2000 census there were 10,509 people, 4,189 households, and 3,066 families living in the CDP. The population density was 961.4 people per square mile (371.2/km). There were 5,026 housing units at an average density of 459.8 per square mile (177.5/km).  The racial makeup of the CDP was 88.70% White, 7.34% African American, 0.59% Native American, 0.78% Asian, 0.08% Pacific Islander, 1.22% from other races, and 1.30% from two or more races. Hispanic or Latino of any race were 3.11%.

Of the 4,189 households 31.3% had children under the age of 18 living with them, 58.1% were married couples living together, 11.4% had a female householder with no husband present, and 26.8% were non-families. 19.4% of households were one person and 6.4% were one person aged 65 or older. The average household size was 2.50 and the average family size was 2.83.

The age distribution was 23.5% under the age of 18, 9.2% from 18 to 24, 29.3% from 25 to 44, 23.1% from 45 to 64, and 14.7% 65 or older. The median age was 37 years. For every 100 females, there were 94.8 males. For every 100 females age 18 and over, there were 92.5 males.

The median household income was $37,736 and the median family income  was $44,085. Males had a median income of $30,123 versus $21,750 for females. The per capita income for the CDP was $20,036. About 8.2% of families and 12.0% of the population were below the poverty line, including 14.5% of those under age 18 and 6.9% of those age 65 or over.

References

Census-designated places in Horry County, South Carolina
Census-designated places in South Carolina